Eileen Reid (born January 1943) is an Irish singer of the showband era.

She had an Irish number 1 on 29 May 1964 with "Fallen Star", and was also known for her song "I Gave My Wedding Dress Away".

Career
Eileen Reid began singing as a teenager with the Melody Makers, later fronting the Cadets showband. She and the Cadets reached No. 42 on the UK Singles Chart dated 6 May 1965 with "Jealous Heart".

She tried out for the 1980 Eurovision with "The Saddest Show On Earth". In 1982, she appeared on The Brendan Grace Show. She appeared on a 1995 episode of Lifelines.

Later she turned to acting, appearing in the Gaiety Theatre, Dublin in pantomime.

In 2008, she appeared on The Podge and Rodge Show.

Personal life
Eileen Reid was the daughter of footballer Charlie Reid. Eileen Reid married Jimmy Day, another showband singer. Her daughter Claudine Day is also a singer.

In 2015, she admitted to multiple infidelities and a miscarriage.

Discography 
Irish chart singles
 1964 "Fallen Star" (number 1)

Bibliography
 Eileen (with Jimmy Day), Town House Dublin, 1995,

Filmography
 Misses Quirke in The Commitments
 Mrs. Rock in A Man of No Importance 
 Woman with smallpox in Moll Flanders (1996 film)
 The Late Late Show, 14 May 2004
 Inside 252, 14 May 2004
 The Journey Home, EWTN, 17 July 2006
 The Podge and Rodge Show, 26 February 2008

References

External links
 

1943 births
Living people
Irish women singers